Pinckneya is a genus of flowering plants belonging to the family Rubiaceae. Its only species is Pinckneya pubens, native to the Southeastern USA. It is known as the Georgia bark or fevertree. It is a small tree of the southern United States closely resembling the cinchona or Peruvian bark. It has pretty, large white flowers, with longitudinal stripes of rose-color. The wood is soft and unfit for use in the arts. The inner bark is extremely bitter.

Habitat and cultivation
Pinckneya pubens is native to poorly drained acidic soils, as along swamp margins. Soils may be fine, medium or coarse textured. Good pest resistance and distinctive flower characteristics make this species of interest to gardeners, who should ensure that it receives occasional irrigation over a dry summer.

References

 
 

Dialypetalantheae
Flora of the United States
Plants described in 1791
Taxobox binomials not recognized by IUCN